Ipochus fasciatus is a species of beetle in the family Cerambycidae. It was described by John Lawrence LeConte in 1852. It is known from Mexico and the United States.

References

Parmenini
Beetles described in 1852